Granida is a pastoral play by Pieter Corneliszoon Hooft, written 1603–1605 and published in 1615.

It was one of the most popular plays of the Dutch Renaissance and Golden Age literature and the subject of many Dutch paintings.

References

External links
 Original text

Dutch plays